Colonia Delta is a Mennonite agricultural settlement in San José Department, Uruguay. It is located 97 km west of Montevideo, near the Arroyo Pavón, not far from Route 1.

Established in 1955 by Vistula delta Mennonites who came from West Prussia, Danzig and Poland to Uruguay. Its Spanish name refers to the Vistula delta.

As of 2011, it had 41 inhabitants.

See also
Mennonites in Uruguay

References

External links
 
 Interview to the family Kunze in Colonia Delta 

1955 establishments in Uruguay
German immigration to Uruguay
Mennonitism in Uruguay
Polish diaspora in South America
Populated places in the San José Department
Religion in San José Department
Vistula delta Mennonites